Tomohon is a city in North Sulawesi (Sulawesi Utara) Province, in central Indonesia. It covers an area of 147.21 km2, and had a population of 91,553 at the 2010 Census, rising to 100,587 at the 2020 Census. Tomohon was formerly a part of the Minahasa Regency in North Sulawesi, but it officially became a city separated from the Regency, inaugurated on 4 August 2003.

Tomohon is known for flower planting at people's homes. Nearby is the volcano Gunung Lokon or Mount Lokon and Mount Empung. Tomohon is also known for wooden-house production, palm-sugar (aren ) production, vegetable agriculture, as a center of Christian Ministry, and as a student town.

History

Tomohon has been written of in several historical records. One of them was found in the ethnographic works of Reverend Nicolaas Graafland, written on 14 January 1864. He described a heart-capturing country on the Minahasa highland in Northern Celebes (Sulawesi) called Tomohon that he had visited in 1850. The development of civilization and the dynamics of development and social implementation from year to year made Tomohon one of the capital districts in the Minahasa regency. In the beginning, Tomohon was a district of the Toumbulu people located in northwestern Minahasa, which consists of Talete, Kamasi, Paslaten, Kolongan, and Matani. In 1880, the Sarongsong district was united into Tomohon, and Kakaskasen district was combined in 1908. In 1927, Tomohon was integrated into Manado as a district, and in 1935, Tombariri district was combined with Tomohon district under Manado. In 1945, Tomohon was separated from Manado and again became the Tomohon district with two subdistrict: Tomohon and Tombariri. During the Permesta between March 1956 and October 1961, some of the Tombariri was combined with Tomohon. In 1974–2003, Tomohon was a district under the Minahasa Regency.

In the early decades of the 2000s, people in some parts of the Minahasa regency bore inspiration and aspirations of the strategic environmental trends both internally and externally for regional expansion. Efforts at reformation and the implementation of regional autonomy had been accelerating the process of accommodation people's aspirations for the expansion of the region. Through a long legal process and mature consideration in order to accelerate national development for the welfare of society, then the Minahasa regency government along with the Regional Representatives Council (Dewan Perwakilan Rakyat Daerah - DPRD) of Minahasa Regency recommended the aspirations for the establishment of South Minahasa Regency, Tomohon and North Minahasa Regency; which was also supported by The Provincial Government of North Sulawesi. The formation of South Minahasa Regency and Tomohon was established by the Central Government by issuing the Act No. 10 of 2003 and the establishment of the North Minahasa Regency through Act No. 33 of 2003.

The establishment of the legislative institution of Tomohon came as election results of 2004, resulting in Tomohon Regional Regulation Number 22 Year 2005 about Regional Symbol and Regulations of Tomohon and No. 29 of 2005 about the Anniversary of Tomohon. Tomohon inaugurated the Minister of Home Affairs Hari Sabarno on behalf of the President of the Republic of Indonesia on 4 August 2003.

Geography

Tomohon is located at 1°15' North and 124°50' East. In general, Tomohon is located on the main circulation route connecting Manado as the provincial capital and other cities in North Sulawesi. Tomohon is surrounded by Minahasa Regency, with the borders of the area are: 
 North: Pineleng and Tombulu District, Minahasa Regency
 South: Remboken and Sonder District, Minahasa Regency
 West: Tombariri District, Minahasa Regency
 East: Tombulu and West Tondano District, Minahasa Regency

The geography of Tomohon is located in the Asian portion of the Pacific Ring of Fire, flanked by two active volcanoes, those are Mount Lokon and Mount Mahawu. The area is mostly made of young volcanic rock, with a composition of andesitic and basaltic tuff, and is of a brittle nature and easily eroded. The material component of the volcanic eruption with a cool temperature increase the fertile soil, and for the people taking advantage to produces fruits, vegetables, and flowers. In the southern, there's a Lake Linow, a naturally formed crater from volcanic eruption. Around the lake, there are various geothermal manifestation such as hot springs, fumarole, and also mud pool.

Climate
Tomohon has a cooler temperature than Manado (Tomohon's neighbor city) which is at a lower land nearby the sea. Tomohon has a tropical rainforest climate (Köppen climate classification Af), with a significant amount of rainfall during the year even for the driest month.

Administration 
The city area based on the Village Potential Data 2014 was 147.21 square kilometres. The city administration is divided into 5 districts (kecamatan) and subdivided into 44 urban villages (kelurahan). The mayor (walikota) leads the city administration. The first mayor of Tomohon was Boy Simon Tangkawarouw. Since 2005, city residents have directly voted for a mayor, and Jefferson SM Rumajar elected as the first definitive mayor.

Administrative districts 
The city is divided into five districts (kecamatan) tabulated below with their areas and their areas and their populations as at the 2010 Census and the 2020 Census. The table also includes the location of the district headquarters, the number of administrative villages (urban kelurahan) in each district, and its postal codes.

Community based ecotourism
In general, Community Based Ecotourism (CBET) is tourism that is managed by the community for the tourist destinations. With general tourism, tourist visits are often marketed and organised by private travel companies and government-protected areas where the bulk of the profits go to the private companies and government enterprises. In contrast, CBET is managed and run by the community itself, management decisions are made by local people and profits directly go to the community. CBET itself, is a part of sustainable tourism development, because it is meets the needs of the present tourists and host regions while protecting and enhancing the opportunity for the future. It is envisaged as leading to management of all resources in such a way that economic, social and aesthetic needs can be fulfilled, while maintaining cultural integrity, essential ecological processes, biological diversity and life support systems (World Tourism Organisation in Bhoj Raj K Hanal, 2007). In order for community based ecotourism to be successful (sustainable), there are many questions that need to be asked and answered in the planning process through implementation stages. One problem of participatory approaches must be pointed out - what defines “community” and “local” in terms of participation? Communities are not free of conflict, nor they are homogeneous. This fact can complicate any development plans for local communities — communities must agree on representatives for decision-making. According to the Quebec Declaration on ecotourism, ecotourism embraces the principles of sustainable tourism. The following principles distinguish it from the wider concept of sustainable tourism:
 Contributes actively to the conservation of natural and cultural heritage; 
 Includes local and indigenous communities in its planning, development and operation contributing to their well-being;
 interprets the natural and cultural heritage of the destination to the visitor; and 
 lends itself better to independent travelers, as well as organizes tours for small sized groups.

Distinctive features
There are several colorful parks in the center of the city with various flowers. The local government of Tomohon City routinely holds an annual flower festival which is able to attract many tourists to come to Tomohon. Other tourism destinations include Lake Linow, waruga (sarcophagus), Tinoor waterfall, Doahill, agritourism in Rurukan, wooden house craft center in Woloan, and amphitheater in Woloan.

Some other tourism destinations nearby Tomohon City are Bunaken sea park, Lake Tondano, Mount Klabat, Mount Soputan, and Kali Waterfall. The 'Visit Tomohon 2008' campaign promoted tourist visits Tomohon. Some of the agendas on Visit Tomohon 2008 were a cultural and music festival, flower exhibition, photography competition, fashion style, and a seminar on flower cultivation.

The city is also known for its infamous wet market, previously called the Tomohon Extreme Market, where mammals such as monkeys, dogs, cats and bats are beaten and torched alive for food "It was the most horrific cruelty I have witnessed so far [in] 10 years … and it was all done in full view of very young children," said Lola Webber, director of Change for Animals Foundation. This market has been described as a "cafeteria for animal pathogens" and a "time bomb", because of the risk of Zoonosis, similar to the way that the Coronavirus disease 2019 arose at the Huanan Seafood Market in Wuhan.

Art and culture
Tombulu language is spoken in and around Kota Tomohon.

Economy
Tomohon has been classified as a medium city (based on the total population) and classified as polis city (based on the level of city development). It is an area that developed into a city that still has the nature of agrarianism. It is called agrarian because most of its inhabitants are farmers by their livelihood. In 2016, Tomohon economic activity ranged on 6.22% with gross domestic local product about 2.6 trillion. The local budget is about 645 billion, which are dynamic and passionate as the stimulus of various large-scale events that generate growth impacts. Life expectancy reached 72.95 years, this shows a good health status indicator with a clean and healthy lifestyle. In the road infrastructure that has been on the asphalt until the year 2015 reached 355.21 kilometers and farm roads that have been built in 2015 along the 3.8 kilometers.

Tourism
Such tourism attractions in Tomohon are suitable to visit, like the volcanoes Mount Lokon and Mount Empung, which were both active volcanoes until now. Also once a year, Tomohon commences a parade with the Tomohon Flower Festival, and Cap Gomeh, which is a Buddhist Chinese ritual also done in the parade. The parade commences from the northern part of Tomohon which is Kakaskasen through the main city road, until the end of the parade, which usually stops at the "Tololiu Statue" at the center of the city. For better tourism atmosphere through Tomohon, using a traditional horse cart or locally called Bendi, Andong, or Delman runs through the city streets and roads.

Education
Tomohon itself is usually called "Kota Siswa" which means "City of Students" after then it was changed to "Kota Bunga" meaning "City of Flowers" after upgrading the status of their residence into an autonomous city. Tomohon itself provides schools starting from Kindergarten to University education centres; there are also many educational centres in Tomohon for student and school needs. In May 2017, Tomohon has 327 kindergartens, 68 elementary schools, 24 middle schools, and 10 high schools. Tomohon also has several universities such as:
 Christian University of Indonesia, Tomohon
 Sariputra Indonesia Tomohon University
 Parakletos Theological Seminary
 St. Luke Academy of Physiotherapy
 Bethesda Nursing Academy
 Nursing Academy of Gunung Maria
 Minaesa Technology Institute

Observatories
Located inside the Lokon St. Nikolaus campus, there is a Mount Lokon Observatory (MLO). In the observatory's dome which is five meters in diameter there are a Meade LX-200 GPS automatic telescope and a Hunter manual telescope. A special feature of the MLO was that was connected to NASA`s space telescopes. This observatory established since October 2011, and was inaugurated by the North Sulawesi governor Sinyo Sarundajang.

Transportation
Tomohon has a public transportation called bendi, a traditional horse cart. Public transportation is often used is mikrolet. Tomohon Terminal is a transportation hub in Tomohon city, serves the mikrolet transportation to various places inside and outside the city, and also serve bus transportation to Manado.

Sister cities 
  Bethlehem, Palestine
  Okegawa, Japan

References

Bibliography

External links
 
 
 Official website